Fatal Love; Or, The Forc'd Inconstancy is a 1680 tragedy by the English writer Elkanah Settle. It was first staged by the King's Company at the Theatre Royal, Drury Lane in London. The original cast members are unknown. Producer at the time of the Popish Plot scare and the Exclusion Crisis, it was notably anti-Catholic similar to Settle's other tragedy of the same year The Female Prelate.

References

Bibliography
 Brown, Frank Clyde. Elkanah Settle. University of Chicago Press, 1910.
 Van Lennep, W. The London Stage, 1660-1800: Volume One, 1660-1700. Southern Illinois University Press, 1960.

1680 plays
West End plays
Tragedy plays
Plays by Elkanah Settle